The Alcide de Gasperi Building is a skyscraper in Luxembourg City, in southern Luxembourg. It is located in Kirchberg, in the north-east of the city.

Footnotes

External links
 

Skyscrapers in Luxembourg
Buildings and structures in Luxembourg City
Office buildings completed in 1965
Skyscraper office buildings
Alcide De Gasperi